The 2011 LPGA Futures Tour was a series of professional women's golf tournaments held from March through September 2011 in the United States. The LPGA Futures Tour is the second-tier women's professional golf tour in the United States and is the "official developmental tour" of the LPGA Tour. In 2011, total prize money on the Futures Tour was $1,765,000.

Leading money winners
The top ten money winners at the end of the season gained membership on the LPGA Tour for the 2012 season, with those finishing in the top five positions gaining higher priority for entry into events than those finishing in positions six through ten. Finishers in positions six through ten had the option to attend LPGA Qualifying School to try to improve their membership status for 2012.

Source and complete list: Futures Tour official website.

Schedule and results
The number in parentheses after winners' names show the player's total number of official money, individual event wins on the Futures Tour including that event.

Tournaments in bold are majors.
Source: Futures Tour official website.

Awards
Player of the Year, player who leads the money list at the end of the season
 Kathleen Ekey
Gaëlle Truet Rookie of the Year Award, first year player with the highest finish on the official money list
 Sydnee Michaels

Heather Wilbur Spirit Award, a Futures Tour player who "best exemplifies dedication, courage, perseverance, love of the game and spirit toward achieving goals as a professional golfer."
 Izzy Beisiegel

See also
2011 LPGA Tour
2011 in golf

External links

Symetra Tour
Futures Tour